Lander's horseshoe bat (Rhinolophus landeri) is a species of bat in the family Rhinolophidae found in Africa. Its natural habitats are savanna and caves.

Taxonomy and etymology
It was described as a new species in 1837 by English naturalist William Charles Linnaeus Martin. The eponym for the species name "landeri" was explorer Richard Lander. Martin named the species after Lander because the holotype had been collected during Lander's expedition to Fernando Pó. It was Martin's intention to posthumously honor Lander, calling him "enterprising, but unfortunate" after his untimely death at age 29.

Description
It is a medium-sized member of its family. Individuals weigh .

Range and habitat
It has been widely documented throughout Sub-Saharan Africa.

Conservation
It is currently evaluated as least concern by the IUCN—its lowest conservation priority. It meets the criteria for this assessment because it has a wide geographic range; its population size is likely large; and it unlikely that it is in rapid decline.

References

Rhinolophidae
Mammals described in 1838
Taxa named by William Charles Linnaeus Martin
Taxonomy articles created by Polbot
Bats of Africa